Yakushido Station may refer to one of the following railway stations in Japan:

 Yakushidō Station (Akita) on the Yuri Kōgen Railway
 Yakushido Station (Miyagi) on the Sendai Subway Tozai Line